Calcium selenide (CaSe) is a chemical compound consisting of the elements calcium and selenium in equal stoichiometric ratio.

Preparation and properties 
Calcium selenide can be prepared via the reaction of calcium and H2Se in liquid NH3.
 Ca + H2Se = CaSe + H2

Calcium selenide reacts with indium(III) selenide in vacuum at high temperature to give CaIn2Se4.
 CaSe + In2Se3 = CaIn2Se4

References 

Selenides
Calcium compounds
Rock salt crystal structure